North American Bridge Championships (NABC) are three annual bridge tournaments sponsored by the American Contract Bridge League (ACBL). The "Spring", "Summer", and "Fall" NABCs are usually scheduled in March, July, and November for about eleven days. They comprise both championship and side contests of different kinds (e.g. matchpoint pairs and knockout teams, one-day and two-day) in many classes of competition (e.g. open/women/senior or defined by masterpoints®). Host cities in the United States and Canada are selected several years in advance.

Competitions and awards

Open team competitions – the premier events

Vanderbilt Cup
Awarded to the National Knock-out Team championship winners at the spring North American Bridge Championship (NABC)s.  It was donated in 1928 by Harold S. Vanderbilt, who won in 1932 and 1940. The event was contested annually in New York as a separate championship until 1958, when it was incorporated into Spring NABCs.

Spingold Trophy
Awarded to the Master Teams championship winners at the summer North American Bridge Championship (NABC). Knockout Teams have been held since 1930, when players competed for the Asbury Park Trophy. 
In 1934, 1936 and 1937, there was a separate Masters Teams-of-Four event.  The two events were merged in 1938 and renamed Spingold Master Knockout Teams.   The trophy was donated by Nathan Spingold in 1934. Since 2001, there has also been a Mini-Spingold I (0–5000), restricted to those with less than 5,000 masterpoints, and a Mini-Spingold II (0–1500) ("Micro-Spingold") restricted to those with less than 1,500 masterpoints.

Reisinger Memorial Trophy
Awarded to the Open Board-a-Match Teams winners at the fall North American Bridge Championship (NABC), it was donated by the
Greater New York Bridge Association in 1965 in memory of Curt H. Reisinger, a great benefactor and official of the ACBL, and replaced the Chicago Trophy. Reisinger teams is the only major team competition with board-a-match scoring. It is an open team event scored with two qualifying sessions, two semifinal sessions and two final sessions

Soloway Knockouts
Announced in fall 2017 to be inaugurated at the fall 2019 North American Bridge Championship (NABC), the Soloway championship will begin as a two-day Swiss teams after which the top 32 teams with their placement as their seed will enter a knockout tournament to determine the winners.

Other competitions, awards and trophies

Over the years the format of competition and masterpoint accumulation has changed.  Accordingly, some trophies, originally awarded for particular achievements in specific categories, have been reassigned or retired.  Below is a summary of past and current trophies at the national level.

 Baldwin Trophy – Awarded to the North American Pairs Flight A winners at the spring North American Bridge Championship (NABC).
 Baze Trophy – Awarded to the Senior Knockout Teams winners at the fall North American Bridge Championship (NABC).
 Bean Trophy – Awarded to the Red Ribbon Pairs winners at the spring North American Bridge Championship (NABC). Prior to 2015, the event was held at the summer NABC.
 Bruce Trophy – Awarded to the Bruce LM-5000 Pairs winners at the summer North American Bridge Championship (NABC).
 Cavendish Trophy – Since 1963, awarded to the Edgar Kaplan Blue Ribbon Pairs winners, now at the fall North American Bridge Championship (NABC); prior to that it was awarded to the National Open Pairs winner.
 Chicago Trophy – Currently awarded to the Mixed Board-a-Match Team winners, at the summer North American Bridge Championship (NABC). Donated by the Auction Bridge Club of Chicago in 1929, the trophy was originally awarded by the American Bridge League to the  winners of the National Contract Championships Open Contract Team-of-Four (board-a-match scoring), which became the North American Open Teams Championship held by the American Contract Bridge League. In 1965, this historic trophy was replaced by the Reisinger Memorial Trophy and the Chicago Trophy began to be awarded to the winners of the Mixed Board-a-Match Teams.
 Barry Crane Top 500 – The masterpoint race which recognizes the 500 individual players who accumulate the most masterpoints in the calendar year.  The winner of the race receives the McKenney Trophy.
 Fishbein Trophy – Awarded every year to the player winning the most masterpoints in the summer North American Bridge Championship (NABC).
 Goren Trophy – Awarded to the player winning the most masterpoints at the fall North American Bridge Championship (NABC).  Prior to 2008, it was known as the Herman Trophy.
 Golder Cup – Awarded to the North American Pairs Flight B winners at the spring North American Bridge Championship (NABC).
 Herman Trophy – renamed the Goren Trophy.
 Jacoby Trophy – Awarded to the Open Swiss Teams winners; now at the spring North American Bridge Championship (NABC).
 Keohane Trophy – Awarded to the North American Swiss Teams winner at the fall North American Bridge Championship (NABC).
 Lebhar Trophy – Awarded to the IMP Pairs winners; now at the spring North American Bridge Championship (NABC).
 Leventritt Trophy – Awarded to the Silver Ribbon Pairs winners at the spring North American Bridge Championship (NABC).
 Machlin Trophy – Awarded to the Women's Swiss Teams winners at the spring North American Bridge Championship (NABC).
 McKenney Trophy – Awarded to the individual player who accumulates the most masterpoints in the calendar year – i.e. the winner of the Barry Crane Top 500 race.
 Manfield Trophy – Awarded to the Non-life Master Pairs winners at the fall North American Bridge Championship (NABC)
Marcus Cup – Awarded to the Senior Masters open teams board-a-match winners from 1953 to 1967 at the summer nationals. Preceded by the Faber Cup from 1946 to 1952. Relegated as a secondary championship in 1968 and discontinued after 1978.
 Helen Sobel Smith Trophy – Awarded to the Life Master Women's Pairs winners, now at the fall North American Bridge Championship (NABC).
 Morehead Trophy – Awarded since 1973 to the winners of the Grand National Teams, a major team championship held at the summer North American Bridge Championship (NABC)s.  Since 2001, it consisted of four flights.  From 1967 to 1972, it had been awarded to the winners of a now defunct special knock-out team event that followed the Reisinger team contest at the fall NABCs.
 Mott-Smith Trophy – Awarded every year to the player winning the most masterpoints in the spring North American Bridge Championship (NABC).
 Nail Trophy – Awarded to the Life Master Open Pairs winners at the fall North American Bridge Championship (NABC).
 Norman Kay Platinum Pairs – Platinum Pairs event at the spring North American Bridge Championship (NABC).
 President's Cup – Awarded to the North American Pairs Flight C winners at the spring North American Bridge Championship (NABC).
 Richmond Trophy – Awarded annually to the Canadian who wins the most masterpoints during a calendar year.
 Rockwell Trophy – Awarded to the Mixed Pairs winners at the spring North American Bridge Championship (NABC).
 Silodor Trophy – Awarded to the winners of the Open Pairs I, now at the spring North American Bridge Championship (NABC).
 Sternberg Trophy – Awarded to the Women's Board-a-Match Teams winners at the fall North American Bridge Championship (NABC).  Superseded the Coffin Trophy in 2001.
 Truscott Trophy – Awarded to the Senior Swiss Teams at the summer North American Bridge Championship (NABC).
 Von Zedtwitz Gold Cup- Awarded to the Life Master Pairs winners at the summer North American Bridge Championship (NABC)
 Wagar Trophy – Awarded to the Women's Knockout Teams at the summer North American Bridge Championship (NABC).
 Whitehead Trophy – Awarded to the Women's Pairs winners at the spring North American Bridge Championship (NABC) – .
 Wernher Trophy – Awarded to the winners of the Open Pairs II at the summer North American Bridge Championship (NABC).
 Young Trophy – Awarded to the Young LM-1500 Pairs winners at the summer North American Bridge Championship (NABC).

North American Bridge Championships' seasonal itinerary 
The following are the current general itineraries of the NABCs.

Discontinued championships
 Master Individual (1931–1960)
 Fall National Open Pairs (1928–1962)
 Hilliard Mixed Pairs (1931–1962)
 Non-Life Master Swiss Teams (1982–1997)
 National 49er Pairs (1998–2007)
 Baze Senior Knockout Teams (1994–2018) (1994–2018)

Past Tournaments (1928–1951)
From 1928 to 1951, there were only 1 or two NABCs a year. The table count is unknown and not listed in the table.

Past Tournaments (1952–)
During each event, the ACBL publishes a Daily Bulletin highlighting attendance, results, schedules, people profiles and interesting hands.

Future tournament locations

Notes

References
  826 pages plus Bibliography.
  477 pages.

External links
 ACBL official website
 World Bridge Championships – World Bridge Federation